Ala Al-Sasi (Arabic: علاء الصاصي) (born 2 July 1987) is a Yemeni international footballer who plays as an attacking midfielder.

International goals
Scores and results list Yemen's goal tally first.

Honours

Club
Al-Ahli San'a'

 Yemeni League: 2006–07
 Yemeni President Cup: 2009

References

External links 
 
kooora.com - Arabic

1987 births
Living people
Yemeni footballers
Yemen international footballers
Yemeni expatriate footballers
Yemeni expatriate sportspeople in Iraq
Yemeni expatriate sportspeople in Qatar
Expatriate footballers in Iraq
Expatriate footballers in Qatar
Association football forwards
Al-Ahli Club Sana'a players
Al-Hilal Al-Sahili players
Al-Mina'a SC players
Al-Sailiya SC players
Yemeni League players
Qatar Stars League players
2019 AFC Asian Cup players